Mendy can refer to:

Mendy (surname), a last name
Mendy (given name), a first name
Idaux-Mendy, commune in the Pyrénées-Atlantiques department in south-western France 
Mendy and the Golem, comic book featuring Jewish characters
Mendy's, a chain of Kosher restaurants, mentioned on the sitcom Seinfeld